Shira (Hebrew: שירה) is a 1971 posthumously-published unfinished Hebrew-language novel by Shmuel Yosef Agnon first serialized in Haaretz between 1948 and 1966, his longest novel at 558 pages and the last one he wrote. It was published by Schocken Books and edited by  who also wrote the afterword and is widely considered one of the greatest Israeli novels.

Synopsis
Set in Jerusalem in the 1930s and 1940s, the story follows Dr. Manfred Herbst, a middle-aged German-Jewish lecturer of Byzantine history at the Hebrew University of Jerusalem who suffers from boredom and spends his days prowling the streets searching for Shira, the beguiling nurse he met when his wife, Henrietta, was giving birth to their third child. Against the background of 1930s Jerusalem and the 1936–1939 Arab riots, Dr. Herbst wages war against the encroachment of age.

References

Alter, Prof. Dr. Robert Bernard. Agnon’s Last Word. In: Commentary, New York, New York: Commentary Inc., 561 7th Avenue, 16th Floor, New York, NY 10018, Volume 51, Number 6, 1 June 1971, pp. 74–81.
Alter, Prof. Dr. Robert Bernard. Hebrew and Modernity. Bloomington, Indiana: Indiana University Press, Indiana University Bloomington, Office of Scholarly Publishing, Herman B Wells Library 350, 1320 E. 10th St., Bloomington, IN 47405-3907, 1994.
Alter, Prof. Dr. Robert Bernard. The Great Genius of Jewish Literature. In: The New York Review of Books, New York, New York: Rea S. Hederman, 435 Hudson Street, Suite 300, New York, NY 10014, Volume 64, Number 6, 6 April 2017.
. Agnon’s Last Novel. In: The Israel Yearbook, Tel Aviv-Yafo: Israel Yearbook Publications, 1973, pp. 251ff.
Band, Prof. Dr. Arnold J. Shira, Agnon’s Posthumous Novel. In: Ariel: The Israel Review of Arts and Letters, Jerusalem: Cultural and Scientific Relations Division, Ministry for Foreign Affairs, Winter 1972.
Ezer, Prof. Dr. Nancy. Flirtation in S.Y. Agnon’s Shira. In: Prof. Dr. David Cortell and Prof. Dr. William Cutter, eds., History and Literature: New Readings of Jewish Texts in Honor of Arnold J. Band, Brown Judaic Studies, Number 334. Providence, Rhode Island: Program in Judaic Studies, Brown University, Box 1826, Providence, RI 02912, 2002, pp. 125–136.
Feldman, Dr. Ahuva. Consciousness of Time and Mission in S. Y. Agnon’s Shira. In: Hebrew Studies, Texas, Austin: National Association of Professors of Hebrew, The University of Texas at Austin, 204 W 21st Street Stop F9400, Calhoun Hall (CAL) 528, Austin, TX 78712, Volume 50, 2009, pp. 339–381.
Golomb Hoffman, Prof. Dr. Anne. Between Exile and Return: S. Y. Agnon and the Drama of Writing, SUNY Series in Modern Jewish Literature and Culture, ed. Prof. Dr. Ezra Cappell. Albany, New York: SUNY Press, State University of New York, 10 North Pearl Street, 4th Floor, Albany, NY 1220, 1991.
Goodman, Roger B. Jewish Fiction (Cont.). In: Jewish Currents, Accord, New York: Workmen’s Circle, POB 111, Accord NY 12404, Volume 44, 1990, pp. 4ff.
Katz, Prof. Dr. Stephen. The Centrifugal Novel: S.Y. Agnon’s Poetics of Composition. Madison, New Jersey: Fairleigh Dickinson University Press, Fairleigh Dickinson University, 842 Cambie Street, Vancouver, BC, V6B 2P6, Canada, 1999.
Kobak, James B. Shira. In: Kirkus Reviews, New York, New York: Kirkus Media, LLC, 65 West 36th St., Suite 700, New York, N.Y. 10018, Volume 1180, 31 October 1989.
. An Uncompromising Search for Truth. In: Haaretz, Tel Aviv-Yafo: M. DuMont Schauberg, 21 Salman Schocken St., P.O. Box 35029, Tel Aviv, Israel 61350, 8 July 2011, p. 1.
Mazor, Prof. Dr. Yair. Shira. In: Shofar: An Interdisciplinary Journal of Jewish Studies, West Lafayette, Indiana: Purdue University Press, Purdue University, Stewart Center 190, 504 West State Street, West Lafayette, IN 47907-2058, Volume 9, Number 1, Fall 1990, pp. 124–126.
Mintz, Prof. Dr. Alan L. Translating Israel: Contemporary Hebrew Literature and Its Reception in America, Judaic Traditions in Literature, Music, and Art, eds. Prof. Dr. Harold Bloom and Prof. Dr. Ken Frieden. Syracuse, New York: Syracuse University Press, Syracuse University, 621 Skytop Road, Suite 110, Syracuse, NY 13244-5290, 2001.
Popien, Astrid. The Bookcase of Dr. Manfred Herbst: S.Y. Agnon’s Novel Shira and European Literature. In: Prof. Dr.  and Prof. Dr. Hillel Weiss, eds., Agnon and Germany: The Presence of the German World in the Writings of S. Y. Agnon. Ramat Gan: , Ramat Gan, 5290002, Israel, 2010, pp. 115–150.
Ramas-Rauch, Prof. Dr. Gila. Shira: S. Y. Agnon’s Posthumous Novel. In: Books Abroad, Norman, Oklahoma: Board of Regents of the University of Oklahoma, 660 Parrington Oval, Room 119, Norman, OK 73019-3074, Volume 45, Noumber 4, Autumn 1971, pp. 636–638.
Saks, Jeffrey. At Professor Bachlam’s. In: Jewish Review of Books, New York, New York: Eric Cohen, 3091 Mayfield Road, Suite 412, Cleveland Heights, OH 44118, (216) 397-1073, Number 17, Spring 2014.
Schulman, Prof. Dr. Grace. Lovers and Other Pedants. In: The New York Times Book Review, New York, New York: The New York Times, The New York Times Company, The New York Times Building, 620 Eighth Avenue, New York City, New York 10018, 24 December 1989.
Shapiro, Zeva. Shira: A Translator’s Afterthoughts. In: Shmuel Yosef Agnon. Shira, S.Y. Agnon Library, ed. Jeffrey Saks, with an “Afterword,” pp. 771–790 by Prof. Dr. Robert Bernard Alter. Trans. Zeva Shapiro. New Milford, Connecticut: Toby Press, Koren Publishers, New Milford, CT 06776-8531, 1989, pp. 791–798, reprinted in: American Jewish Congress Monthly, New York, New York: American Jewish Congress, 115 East 57th Street, Suite 11, New York, NY 10022, Volume 58, Number 2, February 1991, pp. 18–20.
Shavitsky, Prof. Dr. Ziva. The Continual Dislocation of German Jewry: S.Y Agnon’s Thus Far, In Mr Lublin’s Store and Shira. In: Revue Européenne des Études Hébraïques, Saint-Denis, Seine-Saint-Denis: Institut Europeén d’Études Hébraïques, Paris 8 University, Number 5, 2001, pp. 108–139.
Shira. In: Publishers Weekly, New York, New York: PWxyz LLC, 71 West 23 St., ste #1608, New York, NY 10010, Phone 212-377-5500, 1 October 1989.
Zimroth, Prof. Dr. Evan. Agnon and Ecstasy. In: Tikkun, Durham, North Carolina: Duke University Press, Duke University, 2342 Shattuck Avenue, Suite 1200, Berkeley, CA 94704, Volume 6, Number 1, January–February 1991, pp. 27ff.

1971 novels
Adultery in novels
BDSM literature
History books about Jews and Judaism
Campus novels
Hebrew-language novels
Historical novels
20th-century Israeli novels
Novels set in Jerusalem
Novels about antisemitism
Novels about cities
Novels about immigration
Novels about marriage
Novels about nationalism
Novels about terrorism
Novels first published in serial form
Novels published posthumously
Novels set in Mandatory Palestine
Novels set in the 1930s
Novels set in the 1940s
Medical novels
Satirical novels
Sexuality in novels
Unfinished novels
Works about human pregnancy
Works about old age
Schocken Books books